Bruno Oliveira may refer to:

 Bruno de Oliveira (born 1990), Brazilian former football forward
 Bruno Oliveira (footballer, born 1993), Brazilian football right-back for Madureira
 Bruno Oliveira (footballer, born 1998), Brazilian football attacking midfielder for Seoul E-Land FC
 Bruno (footballer, born 2001), Bruno Conceição de Oliveira, Brazilian football winger for Al Jazira